Royal Air Force Bovingdon or more simply RAF Bovingdon is a former Royal Air Force station located near the village of Bovingdon, Hertfordshire, England, about  south-west of Hemel Hempstead and  south-east of Berkhamsted.

During the Second World War, the airfield was used by the Royal Air Force (RAF) and the United States Army Air Forces (USAAF) Eighth Air Force. It was assigned USAAF designation Station 112, station code "BV", later changed to "BZ".

Royal Air Force use
Bovingdon was built in 1941–42 as a standard Class A RAF bomber airfield. Over 30 dispersal hardstandings were built.

On 15 June 1942, No. 7 Group, RAF Bomber Command took up residence at Bovingdon. Operational missions were flown in June and July by the RAF until the field was turned over to the USAAF in August.

United States Army Air Forces use
USAAF Station Units assigned to RAF Bovingdon were: 
 1st Combat Crew Replacement Center Group
 11th Combat Crew Replacement Center Group
 328th Service Group (VIII Air Force Service Command)
 347th Service Squadron; HHS 328th Service Group
 18th Weather Squadron
 26th Station Complement Squadron
 Headquarters & Headquarters Squadron (VIII Fighter Command)
Regular Army Station Units included:
 1054th Signal Company
 1071st Quartermaster Company
 1787th Ordnance Supply & Maintenance Company
 978th Military Police Company
 2128th Engineer Fire Fighting Platoon

The primary mission of Bovingdon was to support Eighth Air Force Headquarters and the Air Technical Section, both equipped with a variety of aircraft types. General Eisenhower's personal B-17 was housed on the base.  During World War II, several film stars were assigned at one time or another to the base, including Clark Gable, James Stewart and William Holden. Among famous wartime visitors were Bob Hope, Frances Langford, Mrs Eleanor Roosevelt, and Glenn Miller.

A unique mission undertaken at Bovingdon was the training of United States journalists to cover the air war over Occupied Europe.  A group of military journalists underwent training in February 1943 to fly high-altitude missions in bombers, to shoot the flexible machine guns (although they did not actually fire them in combat), as well as parachute and life support training as aircrew.

The group of journalists flew on a combat mission over Wilhelmshaven, Germany on 26 February 1943 to attack the German Naval submarine pens there. The mission saw heavy losses for the USAAF, and the aircraft of Andy Rooney of the Stars and Stripes was damaged by flak and Robert Post of the New York Times was killed in action when his B-24 exploded. This ended the training of journalists to fly along with Eighth Air Force bomber crews.   Other journalists who underwent this training included Walter Cronkite, James Denton Scott, Homer Bigart, William Wade and Gladwin Hill.

92nd Bombardment Group (Heavy) 

The first USAAF tenant at Bovingdon was the 92nd Bombardment Group (Heavy), being deployed from Sarasota Army Air Field, Florida. The group was known as "Fame's Favored Few", and it was assigned to the 40th Combat Bombardment Wing at RAF Thurleigh. The group tail code was a "Triangle B". Its operational squadrons were:

 325th Bombardment Squadron (NV)
 326th Bombardment Squadron (JW)
 327th Bombardment Squadron (UX)
 407th Bombardment Squadron (PY)

The group flew a few two combat missions in September and October 1942, then was assigned the role of a Boeing B-17 Flying Fortress Combat Crew Replacement Unit (CCRU). In January 1943, it was transferred to RAF Alconbury where it was became an operational combat group.

11th Combat Crew Replacement Center Group
Although the 92nd Bomb Group departed for Alconbury, the 326th Bomb Squadron of the 92nd remained at Bovingdon to form the core of 11th Combat Crew Replacement Center Group.  The training was performed on the Boeing B-17E Flying Fortress aircraft, and most combat crews of Eighth Air Force bombing units for the balance of the war received their introduction before moving on to their operational bases.   Although based at Bovingdon, the 326th remained under the operational control of the 92nd at Alconbury until May 1943.

In September 1944 the 11th CCRCG was disbanded and Bovingdon became the base for the European Air Transport Service (EATS). Many thousands of Americans returned to the States via the air terminal.

Postwar uses 
After the war, Bovingdon was returned to RAF control on 15 April 1947. The British Ministry of Civil Aviation obtained the airfield for civilian airline use. On 15 September 1949, Bovingdon was the start point for a successful record air speed attempt by a de Havilland Hornet to and from Gibraltar.

Because of its elevation of about 160 metres, Bovingdon was often clear when Heathrow Airport and RAF Northolt were fog-bound; during the winter months especially, Bovingdon was used by British European Airways (BEA). British Overseas Airways Corporation (BOAC) used Bovingdon as a maintenance facility and numerous other independent aircraft operators used the former technical site during the postwar years.

During the 1950s both civilian and military organizations used Bovingdon. The proximity of the USAF Third Air Force Headquarters at RAF South Ruislip and HQ RAF Fighter Command at Bentley Priory made Bovingdon the ideal location for service aircraft.

The USAF returned to Bovingdon on 25 May 1951, with the establishment of the 7531st Air Base Squadron. Douglas C-47 Skytrains were assigned to the unit, however many transitory USAF planes used the airfield routinely. In addition, the RAF operated the Fighter Command Communication Squadron RAF on the base.  In October 1962, the USAF departed from Bovingdon. During the 60s, RAF Transport Command (Southern Communication Squadron RAF) operated Anson, Devon, Pembroke and latterly Basset aircraft from Bovingdon. In the 1960s the base was home to the last flight of Anson Mk 21 aircraft, descended from a World War II design.

The Air Training Corps 617 Gliding School operated from Bovingdon between 1968 and 1970; the last flight by a military aircraft was by Kirby Cadet Mk.3 glider XN246 on 25 Oct 1970. The school had moved from RAF Hendon in 1968, but moved on to RAF Manston in 1971. In 1968 the airfield was used to store and dispose of several aircraft used in the making of the film "Battle of Britain".

Closure and civilian use
In 1968, the Ministry of Defence (MOD) announced that Bovingdon would be closed for budgetary reasons, and in 1972 the airfield was shut down, although from World War II to present day, the runway, 650m long × 49m wide, on Berry Farm has continuously been used for light aircraft activities. Berry Farm is owned separately by the Webb family and is unconnected to the part of the original airfield where the land has been used for various other uses, including the market. In 2012 Dacorum Borough Council confirmed that the Berry Farm stretch of runway 08/26 remains a legally active airfield for light aircraft operation.

In the early 1980s, flying returned to the airfield, first with hang-glider tow-launching (using a truck-mounted pay-out winch) and then microlight aircraft, mainly of the 'Trike/hang-glider' type. Some local residents complained on the grounds of noise and danger. After a local inquiry, the Ombudsman narrowly decided against allowing flying to continue. At that time the combined control tower and fire-tender garage were in 'reasonable structural condition' but deliberately damaged a few years later by earthmoving equipment, thereafter making restoration highly unlikely. The remains of the control tower were demolished in August 2010.

An area of the former technical site was transferred to HM Prison Service for use as a prison, called 'The Mount' which opened in 1987.

The airfield site still houses a VOR navigational beacon, code BNN. The airspace above the airfield and nearby Chesham is known as the Bovingdon stack and is a holding area for aircraft approaching Heathrow Airport,  to the south. Aircraft are requested to join the hold, typically at an altitude of 7000–16000 feet, and then to fly a 'race-track' pattern around the Bovingdon VOR beacon, separated at vertical intervals of 1000 feet from other aircraft. Each aircraft is then instructed to descend to a lower available altitude as the lowest aircraft leaves the hold to make its final approach to Heathrow. At busy times there may be up to 10 aircraft holding at the available 1000 foot separations between 7000 feet and 16000 feet, and these may be seen circling overhead on a clear day.

The remainder of the airfield site was used for a regular Saturday market and there was also a permanent circuit for banger racing which closed in September 2008. The main runway and taxiways are still intact though in a poor state of repair, but are also used for other events such as autojumbles and classic car shows. Alongside a runway is a Delta Force Paintballing facility. The ruins of the control tower also remain.

It was reported in September 2021 that new studios would be added to the Airfield and that Bovingdon Market would be closing down due to the new studios. It was confirmed on the Bovingdon Market Facebook page in March 2022 that the market would be ceasing trading on the site after 40 years of trading due to television works taking over the airfield with 3 new studios, new offices and a backlot being added to the sit. The final day of trading for Bovingdon Market was 29 August 2022.

ITV Studios Bovingdon
ITV Studio Bovingdon (also known as Bovingdon Airfield) near Hemel Hempstead England is a television studio complex for ITV Studios. The studios opened in January 2018. ITV Bovingdon currently has one full sized studio which was purpose built for Dancing on Ice. A number of other productions are also filmed at ITV Studios Bovingdon including Michael McIntyre's The Wheel and The Masked Singer.

In September 2021, it was announced that ITV Studio Bovingdon had submitted plans to expand the studio capacity by building three new permanent studios, new office spaces, a backlot for temporary studios and sets. The plans were granted in 2022 this will take the number of studios at ITV Bovingdon to 4 once completed along with a backlot. It was reported in August 2022 that ITV Bovingdon's new backlot will become home of the new Big Brother UK house which will return to ITV in 2023.

Studios
Studio 1 – 2088 square metres (22,483 ft2) – Studio 1 is currently home to programmes such as Dancing on Ice, The Masked Singer, The Wheel and The Masked Dancer. The studio can accommodate audiences and an ice rink. Studio 1 opened in January 2018 with Dancing on Ice being the first series to be filmed there.

Future development will include three additional studios and a backlot.

Programmes
The studios are home to many television programmes, including:

Other film and television appearances
In the 1960s, Bovingdon was used in the production of four World War II films, The War Lover (1962); 633 Squadron (1964) Battle of Britain (1969) and Mosquito Squadron (1969).  Although flying ceased at the airfield in 1969, it was also used to film parts of the flying car scenes in the James Bond film The Man With the Golden Gun starring Roger Moore, when the palm trees fold down as it takes off. In 1977, parts of the Golden Gate Bridge sequence from Superman were filmed on one of the runways. In 1978, some flying scenes for the film Hanover Street.. The site was also used in the 2016 Star Wars film Rogue One, representing the planet Scarif.

On television, it served as the location for at least one black and white episode of The Avengers "The Hour That Never Was", starring Patrick Macnee and Diana Rigg featuring Gerald Harper and Roy Kinnear as well as the 1980 Blake's 7 episode The Harvest of Kairos as the surface of the planet Kairos. An airstrip at the airfield is also reputed to have been used in the opening credits of the 1967 television series The Prisoner in which Patrick McGoohan is seen driving a Lotus Super Seven car past the camera at speed. The control tower and airfield was the filming location for the 1981 movie Silver Dream Racer starring David Essex and Beau Bridges. In the movie, the montage scene before the final race shows Essex and Christina Raines training for the forthcoming grand prix. It has continued to be used in various TV shows up to the present day. The airfield has also been used in the production of the film Bohemian Rhapsody, as the production crew were required to recreate the 1985 Live Aid set.

Major units assigned
 Royal Air Force
 No. 150 Staging Post RAF (9 Aug 1946 - 18 Feb 1947)
 Flying Training Command Communication Squadron RAF (9 Jul 1947 - 30 Jun 1963)
 Bomber Command Communication Squadron RAF (31 Mar - 30 Jun 1963)
 Bomber/Fighter/Coastal Command Communication Squadron RAF (30 Jun - 1 Aug 1963)
 Southern Communication Squadron RAF (1 Aug 1963 - 1 Jan 1969)
 No. 617 Volunteer Gliding School RAF (1968 - Sep 1969)
 Strike Command Communication Squadron RAF (1 - 27 Jan 1969)

 United States Army Air Forces
 92d Bombardment Group, ( 18 Aug 1942 - 6 Jan 1943)
 11th Combat Crew Replacement Unit, (Jan 1943 - Sep 1944)
 92d Bombardment Group, ( 18 Aug 1942 - 6 Jan 1943)
 1402nd Air Base Group (Oct 1944 - Apr 1946)

 United States Air Force
 7531st Air Base Squadron (25 May 1951 - 1962)
 2130 Communications Group (1961 to 1991)

See also

 List of former Royal Air Force stations

References

Citations

Bibliography
 Maurer Maurer, Air Force Combat Units of World War II, Office of Air Force History, 1983
 Freeman, Roger A., Airfields of the Eighth, Then And Now, 1978
 Freeman, Roger A., The Mighty Eighth, The Colour Record, 1991
 Maurer Maurer, Air Force Combat Units of World War II, Office of Air Force History, 1983
 USAAS-USAAC-USAAF-USAF Aircraft Serial Numbers--1908 to present

External links

 Control Towers - RAF Bovingdon

Royal Air Force stations in Hertfordshire
Royal Air Force stations of World War II in the United Kingdom
Installations of the United States Air Force in the United Kingdom
Military installations closed in 1972
Airfields of the VIII Bomber Command in the United Kingdom
RAF
Military installations established in 1942
1942 establishments in England
1972 disestablishments in England